Col d'Andrion (el. 1680 m.) is a high mountain pass in the Alps in the department of Alpes-Maritimes in France.

It connects Roquebillière in the Vésubie River valley and Pont de la Lune in the valley of the Tinée River.

See also
 List of highest paved roads in Europe
 List of mountain passes

Andrion
Andrion
Landforms of Alpes-Maritimes